Flying Lady may be:
 Flying Lady (TV series), a British 1987–1989 TV series
 Spirit of Ecstasy, the hood ornament on Rolls-Royce cars
 a monorail system by Pelham Park and City Island Railway